Counter Terrorism and Transnational Crime - CTTC is a specialized branch of Bangladesh Police formed to tackle terrorism and transnational crime. Deputy Inspector General Md. Asaduzzaman bpm (bar) is the chief of the branch.

History
Bangladesh Police recommended the formation of a special unit, called Police Bureau of Counter-Terrorism, in August 2011 to the Home ministry. In September 2013 the Home Ministry sent it to the Ministry of Public Administration. A rise in terror attacks in 2015 increased demand for the unit. On 16 February 2016 Counter Terrorism and Transnational Crime Unit of Dhaka Metropolitan Police was formed with 600 personnel. In March 2017 it carried out a raid in Sitakunda, Chittagong leading to the death of two militants. It provided support to Operation Twilight by 1st Para-Commando Battalion of Bangladesh Army on 25 March 2017.

Organisation 
CTTC has Seven Divisions.

Special Action Group 

 SWAT (Bangladesh)

The SWAT (Special Weapons And Tactics) is another elite tactical unit of the Dhaka Metropolitan Police which was established on 28 February 2009. SWAT is operated under the Special Action Group of Counter Terrorism and Transnational Crime of Dhaka Metropolitan Police.

 K9
 Bomb Disposal Unit

CT-Cyber Crime Investigation 
The CT-Cyber Crime Investigation, former Cyber Security & Crime Division, popularly known as the Cyber Crime Unit, is a branch of Bangladesh Police which is operated under the Counter Terrorism and Transnational Crime of Dhaka Metropolitan Police. The main function of this division is to prevent, patrol, detect and investigate cyber-terrorism and cyber-crime in Dhaka.

References

Bangladeshi intelligence agencies
Non-military counterterrorist organizations
Counterterrorism in Bangladesh
Police units of Bangladesh
Domestic intelligence agencies